Emilie Baker Loring (September 5, 1866 – March 13, 1951) was an American romance novelist of the 20th century.  She began writing in 1914 at the age of 50 and continued until her death after a long illness in 1951. After her death, her estate was managed by her sons, Selden M. and Robert M. Loring, who, based on a wealth of unfinished material they discovered, published 20 more books under her name until 1972. These books were ghostwritten by Elinore Denniston.

Personal life

Emilie Loring was born in Boston, Massachusetts, in 1866 to George M. Baker and Emily Frances (Boles) Baker. Her father was a playwright and publisher and her mother was a homemaker.  Loring married Victor J. Loring, who was a lawyer.  She died in Wellesley, Massachusetts, on March 13, 1951.  At the time of her death, Loring had sold more than a million copies of her first 30 books.

Loring's sister, Rachel Baker Gale, wrote a number of suffrage parlor plays.

Loring's son, Selden M. Loring, was also an author.  He wrote Young Buckskin Spy (Lantern Press, 1954) and Mighty Magic: An Almost-True Story of Pirates and Indians (Holliday House, 1964).

The papers of Emilie Loring are housed in the Department of Special Collections, Boston University, Mugar Memorial Library.

Works

Most of Loring's books are highly romantic mysteries that focus on a young, independent woman with courage and ideals who finds herself in a tricky situation, relies on the help of a strong, handsome man, and ends up with him at the end of the story. Beyond romance and mystery, her books also explore a selection of topics including marriage, love, the work ethic, American patriotism, freedom, and optimism. 

She enjoyed painting pictures with words, often describing the environment, architecture, dress, food, and physical features of characters in exacting and colorful detail.  In the books published after she died, much the colorful description was left out. Another major difference in the books published before and after the author's death is the characters' language, a change for the better. In the early books, too many of the characters use American slang, which sounds like it came straight from the early talkies.

Loring's work features several repeating motifs; among them are a heroine in her early 20s with dark hair, a dark-haired lawyer or aspiring politician for a hero, a secondary male predisposed to speaking in quotations, a "sleek" bad guy, a wise, older woman who may or may not end up with a wise, older man who has long been in love with her, a flirtatious blond woman vying for the hero, and  New England as a setting or character trait: "New England granite". Often-used plot devices in her novels include an orphaned character, a marriage of convenience or contract, a clandestine marriage, and trouble coming from outside a well-knit social structure.

Her book Beyond the Sound of Guns (1945) is referenced nine times in America's Popular Sayings: Over 1600 Expressions on Topics from Beauty to Money and Everything in Between by Gregory Titelman, citing phrases that turn out to be quotes or paraphrases from someone else.

Publishing and copyright history
Her earlier books, published from 1922 to 1937, were originally published in hardcover by William Penn & Company in Philadelphia. Her books from 1938 to 1950 were originally published by Little, Brown and Company, as were all of her posthumous works. All 30 of her novels written during her lifetime were reprinted by Grosset (now Grosset & Dunlap) in 1961. Later, all of her works were reprinted in mass-market paperback editions by the romance division of Bantam Books.

As late as 2005, Thorndike Press, an imprint of Thomson Gale, was reprinting select titles in large-print format, although its website did not show them in its 2007 catalog.
Little, Brown and Company owns the copyright on books dated (1952?) to 1954.  Emilie Loring's sons, Robert and Selden, are listed as "child of the author" in searchable copyright renewal records.

Selden was listed first in the copyright information from 1955 to 1960 (or 1961?).  From 1962 to 1971, Robert is listed first in the copyright information.  In the 1972 novel The Shining Years, only Robert is listed as the copyright owner as the executor of the estate of Emilie Baker Loring.

List of published works

As Josephine Story

Articles and short stories
"Rush order for fancy dress".  St. Nicholas Magazine, Vol. 41, p. 977, September 1914.
"Gossip; an endless chain".  St. Nicholas Magazine, Vol. 42, p. 508-9, April 1915.
"The delicate art of being a mother-in-law".  Woman's Home Companion, vol. 46, p. 100, June 1919.

Books
For the Comfort of the Family; a Vacation Experiment (George H. Doran Company, 1914) 
The Mother in the Home (Pilgrim, 1917)

As Emilie Loring

Articles and short stories
"Box from Nixon's".  Woman's Home Companion, vol. 48, p. 9-10, May 1921. For information on this periodical, see 
"Glycerine tears". The Delineator, vol. 106, p. 8-9, March 1925.

Novels (chronological order)

Play
Where's Peter? (Penn, 1928)

Further reading 
 Emilie Loring: A Twentieth Century Romanticist, by Dorothea Lawrance Mann.  Philadelphia: Penn Publishing Company, 1928.  (out-of-print)
 Something About the Author: Facts and Pictures About Authors and Illustrators of Books for Young People, vol. 51, edited by Anne Commire.  Gale Research, 1988. pp. 103–104. (out-of-print)
 Pitfalls for Readers of Fiction, by Hazel Sample.  Chicago: National Council of Teachers of English, [1940].  Available for purchase only at 
 Twentieth-Century Romance and Gothic Writers, edited by James Vinson.  Gale Research, 1982. pp. 443–445. 
 Twentieth-Century Romance and Historical Writers, 2nd ed., edited by Lesley Henderson.  Chicago, St. James Press, 1990. pp. 406–407. , 3rd Edition, edited by Aruna Vasudevan, St. James Press, 1994.  
 American Novelists of Today, by Harry R. Warfel.  American Book, 1951. Greenwood Press Reprint, 1973.

References

External links
 
 
 

1864 births
1951 deaths
20th-century American novelists
American women novelists
20th-century American women writers
20th-century American short story writers
American women short story writers
Writers from Boston